The Drought is the second album from The Kill Devil Hills, released in October 2006.

The album was recorded in late November 2005 at the Donnelly River Mill Worker's Club and then between February and June 2006 at Studio Couch, North Fremantle, with producer Ben Franz (The Waifs).

Track listing
"Did I Damage You?" – 3:10
"Dogs O' War" – 2:32
"Nasty Business" – 5:18
"Boneyard Rider" – 4:39
"The Drought" – 5:44
"Drugs, Spices & Silk" – 6:03
"New Country" – 3:13
"This Old Town" – 6:38
"The Forsaken Few" – 4:32
"I Wonder If She's Thinking Of Me Now" – 5:33
"Jesus Train" – 3:14

Reviews
Australian Music Online Review
Web Wombat Review

2006 albums
The Kill Devil Hills albums
Shock Records albums